This is a list of journalism schools in Asia.

Bangladesh

 Department of Mass Communication and Journalism, University of Dhaka
 Mass Communication and Journalism Discipline, University of Khulna
 Department of Mass Communication and Journalism, Jagannath University
 Department of journalism and media studies, Jahangirnagar University
 Department of Communication and Journalism Studies, North Bengal International University, Rajshahi, Bangladesh 
 Department of Media and Communication, Independent University, Bangladesh
 Department of Mass Communication and Journalism, University of Rajshahi
 Department of Communication and Journalism, University of Chittagong
 Department of Journalism, Stamford University (Bangladesh)
 Department of Journalism, University of Liberal Arts Bangladesh
 Department of Mass Communication and Journalism, American International University (Bangladesh)
 Department of Journalism and Mass Communication, Daffodil International University
 Department of Mass Communication and Journalism, Begum Rokeya University
 Newport Institute of Technology, Print and Broadcast Journalism
Department of Journalism and Media Communication, Green University of Bangladesh

China

 School of International Journalism, Shanghai International Studies University
 School of Journalism and Communication, Renmin University of China
 School of Television and Journalism, Communication University of China
 Fudan Journalism School, Fudan University
 School of Journalism and Communication, Wuhan University
 Tsinghua School of Journalism and Communication, Tsinghua University
 Journalism and Information Communication School, Huazhong University of Science and Technology
 College of Literature and Journalism, Sichuan University
 School of Journalism and Communication, Peking University
 School of Journalism and Communication, Jinan University

Dubai, UAE

 ESJ-Orient Emirates School of Journalism
 Faculty of Media & Journalism, Murdoch University

Japan
 Waseda University

Jordan

JMI-Jordan Media Institute

Hong Kong

 Institute for Journalism and Society, Hong Kong Baptist University
 Department of Journalism, Hong Kong Baptist University
 Department of Journalism and Communication, Chu Hai College
 School of Journalism and Communication, Chinese University of Hong Kong
 School of Communication, Hang Seng University
 Journalism and Media Studies Centre, University of Hong Kong
 Department of Journalism and Communication, Shue Yan University

India
 Auro University's School of Journalism and Mass Communication, Surat, Gujarat
 Institute of Journalism and Mass Communication
 Center of Media Studies, IPS, University of Allahabad, Uttar Pradesh.
 [School of Journalism and Media Studies, Uttarakhand Open University, Haldwani, Nainital
 Delhi school of journalism, University of Delhi, New Delhi
 Makhanlal Chaturvedi National University of Journalism and Communication, Bhopal, INDIA 
 Department of Communication & Journalism, Gauhati University
 Department of Journalism & Communication, University of Madras
 Department of journalism and Mass communication Dev Sanskriti Vishwavidhyalaya- Haridwar
 AJK, Mass Communication Research Centre, Jamia Millia Islamia University, New Delhi
 Apeejay Institute of Mass Communication, New Delhi
 Amity School of Journalism And Communication, New Delhi
 Annapurna International School of Film + Media
 Asian College of Journalism, Chennai
 Department of Journalism and Mass Communication, EFLU, Hyderabad
 Department of Media Studies and Visual Communication, GITAM School of Humanities and Social Sciences, Hyderabad
 Geeturai School of Journalism and Mass Communication, Hyderabad
 Mediamindz Institute of Film and Media, Hyderabad
 Department of Communication and Journalism, Pune University
 NBA School of Mass Communication, New Delhi (National Broadcasting Academy)
 Sri Aurobindo Centre for Arts & Communication, Sri Aurobindo Centre for Arts & Communication
 Seamedu School of Pro-Expressionism, Department of Broadcast Journalism
 Faculty of Media Studies, Manav Rachna International University
 Department of Communication and Journalism, Mumbai University
 Department of Journalism, Delhi College of Arts and Commerce, University of Delhi
 Department of Journalism, Makhanlal Chatuverdi National University of Journalism & Communication
 Department of Journalism & Mass Communication, University of Calcutta
 Department of Mass Communication, Assam University
 Department of Mass Communication, School of Professional Studies, Krishna Kanta Handique State Open University
 Department of Journalism and Mass Communication, North Eastern Hill University, Shillong
 Indian Institute of Mass Communication
 Kushabhau Thakre University of Journalism & Mass Communication
 Manorama School of Communication
School of Journalism & Mass Communication- Noida International University
 School for Radio and Television Journalism, Bharatiya Vidya Bhavan
 School for Radio and Television Journalism, Mahatma Gandhi Chitrakoot Gramoday University
 School of Mass Communication, Jagran Institute of Management and Mass Communication at Noida
 School of Communication Studies, Panjab University
 Symbiosis Institute of Media and Communication
 Xavier Institute of Communications
 BFIT, Dehradun Hemwati Nandan Bahuguna Garhwal University
 Department of journalism and mass communication - Faculty of Science And Humanities SRM Institute of Science and Technology
 Department of Journalism and Mass Communication, Punjabi University
 Institute of Journalism & Mass Communication, Chhatrapati Shahu Ji Maharaj University, Kanpur
 Indian Institute of Journalism & New Media, Bangalore
 International Institute of Management, Media & IT ( IIMMI )
 Trinity Institute of Professional Studies (TIPS), Dwarka
 Heritage Institute of Management & Communication (HIMCOM), New Delhi

Indonesia
 Department of Communication,University of Indonesia
 Department of Public Relations dan Marketing, University Diponergoro
 Faculty of Communication, University of Padjajaran
 Department of Communication, University of Airlangga
 Faculty of Communication,  Multimedia Nusantara University
 Department of Communication, University of 17 Agustus 1945 Surabaya
 Faculty of Communication, Widya Mandala Catholic University Surabaya
 Department of Communication Science, FISIPOL, Universitas Gadjah Mada

Iran

Faculty of Communications, Allameh Tabataba'i University

Malaysia

 Department of Journalism, Universiti Tunku Abdul Rahman
 School of Mass Communication & Media, University Technology MARA
 Faculty of Communication, University of Science, Malaysia

Myanmar

 Yangon Journalism School (YJS)
 Mandalay Journalism School
 Myanmar Journalism Institute (MJI)
 National Management Degree College (BA. Journalism)

Nepal

 Ratna Rajyalaxmi Campus Tribhuvan University
 Kantipur City College (KCC), Purbanchal University
 College of Mass Communication and Journalism (CJMC), Kathmandu Purwanchal University

Pakistan
 Department of Mass media and communication, University of Sindh
 Department of Media and Communication Studies, International Islamic University, Islamabad
 Department of Mass Communication, Bahauddin Zakariya University Multan
 Department of Mass Communication, Lahore College for Women University
 Department of Mass Communication, National University of Modern Languages
 Department of Mass Communication, Quaid-i-Azam University
 Department of Mass Communication, University of Karachi
 Department of Media Studies, Islamia University
 Institute of Communication Studies, University of the Punjab
 School of Media & Mass Communication, Beaconhouse National University
 Department of Media Studies, Kinnaird College for Women, Lahore

Philippines
Asian Academy of Television Arts
Asian Institute of Journalism and Communication
Colegio de San Juan de Letran
Far Eastern University Institute of Arts and Sciences
Lyceum of the Philippines University
The Manila Times College
Polytechnic University of the Philippines
University of the Philippines College of Mass Communication
University of Santo Tomas Faculty of Arts and Letters
University of the East College of Arts and Sciences
De La Salle University – Dasmariñas Broadcast Journalism

Singapore

 Division of Journalism & Publishing, Wee Kim Wee School of Communication and Information, Nanyang Technological University
 School of Film and Media Studies, Ngee Ann Polytechnic

South Korea

 Graduate School of Journalism, Journalism School Semyung University
 Department of Communication, Seoul National University
 Department of Communications, Pusan National University
 Department of Journalism and Mass Communication, Hankuk University of Foreign Studies
 Department of Media and Communications, Korea University

Taiwan, ROC

 The Graduate Institute of Journalism, National Taiwan University
Department of Journalism, National Chengchi University
 Department of Journalism, Shih Hsin University
 Department of Journalism and Communication Studies, Fu Jen Catholic University
Department of Journalism, National Chung Cheng University
Department of Journalism, Chinese Culture University
Department of Journalism, Ming Chuan University

Thailand

 Faculty of Communication Arts, Chulalongkorn University
 Faculty of Journalism and Mass Communication, Thammasat University
 Faculty of Mass Communication, Chiang Mai University
 Faculty of Communication Arts, Dhurakijpundit University

Vietnam

 Faculty of International Communication, Diplomatic Academy of Vietnam
 Institute of Journalism, Academy of Journalism and Communication 
 School of Journalism and Communication, VNU University of Social Sciences and Humanities
 Faculty of Broadcasting, Academy of Journalism and Communication
 Faculty of Public Relations and Advertisement, Academy of Journalism and Communication
 Faculty of International Affairs, Academy of Journalism and Communication

References

http://www.semyung.ac.kr/eng.do

Journalism lists
Journalism schools
Journalism schools